James W. "Jim" Long (October 9, 1936–January 24, 1998) was an American politician who served in the Kansas House of Representatives as a Democrat from the 38th district. He was originally appointed to the seat to fill the vacancy left by the resignation of John F. Sutter. After a one-term absence in which the seat was held by Tom Love, Long reclaimed the seat in the 1992 election and served until his death in 1998. His wife, Margaret Long, was appointed to succeed him.

References

Democratic Party members of the Kansas House of Representatives
1936 births
1998 deaths
20th-century American politicians
Politicians from Kansas City, Kansas